Xplore Dundee is a bus operator based in Dundee, Scotland, operating services mainly within Dundee City. The operator also runs a service to Edinburgh Airport. It is a subsidiary of McGill’s Buses, which is based in Greenock, Scotland.

History

The company has its origins in the Dundee and District Tramways Company, which commenced horse tram operations on 30 August 1877. Steam traction was adopted in 1885. On 1 June 1899, the company was compulsorily acquired by the local municipality to become Dundee City Tramways, which was electrified between 1900 and 1902.

From 1922, motor buses began to be operated in addition to the trams. The tram system continued to be extended until 1933. But by 1956, the trams had been fully replaced by buses and the company renamed Dundee Corporation Transport.
 
Local government reorganisation meant that the bus operation passed to Tayside Regional Council in May 1975. In spite of the change of name, the council's bus operations were confined to the Dundee area. The livery was changed from green to dark blue, light blue and white.

In preparation for bus deregulation in October 1986 it was restructured into a separate legal entity, Tayside Bus Company Limited and in 1991 sold in a management buy out. In February 1997 it was sold to National Express and that year renamed Travel Dundee. The livery changed again, this time to blue, red and white.

Travel Greyhound was the coaching subsidiary which offered a range of coaches and buses for hire. Greyhound Luxury Coaches used to be a trading name for TD Alexander and Sons who commenced operations in 1960. The business was acquired by Tayside Public Transport on 13 August 1990, and re-branded Tayside Greyhound. The Greyhound brand is no longer in use.

Travel Dundee had been a contractor to Scottish Citylink form many years. However, shortly after the formation of a joint venture between Citylink and Stagecoach in November 2005, Travel Dundee's services ceased. They were reinstated at short notice from 9 January 2006 when extra journeys were added to route M91 from Perth direct to Edinburgh. In May 2006, Travel Dundee commenced operating journeys on route M90 Perth - Kinross - Dunfermline - Edinburgh. Citylink ceased for the third time in September 2008, as part of a review of coaching activities.

In November 2007 National Express announced plans to re-brand all of their operations under a new unified National Express identity with Travel Dundee rebranded as National Express Dundee in October 2008.

In June 2015, it was announced that the business would be rebranded as Xplore Dundee with a green livery resembling that of Dundee Corporation Transport introduced. The rebrand occurred on 12 September 2015.

On 22 December 2020, it was announced that National Express had agreed to sell the business to McGill's Bus Services.

Fare structure
Short hop fares (valid for one fare stage) and max singles (two or more fare stages) are used for single journeys. There are discounts for children and young people.

A range of multi-use fares are available, including daysavers and travelcards which are available for 1-week, 4-week and 52-week periods. Group and evening tickets are also available. Contactless payments were introduced in 2019, and discounts are in place for customers purchasing m-tickets on the Xplore Dundee app.

Routes
The company operates a number of urban routes, with school routes indicated with the suffix S. Part-routes operate with the prefix 9, with the 5, 17, 22, and 28 becoming the 905, 917, 922, and 928.

Vehicle types

Xplore Dundee has a fleet of 441
Some vehicles have come from other National Express operators in the West Midlands and from the now sold operation in London.

From 1997 to 1999, shortly after National Express took over, Travel Dundee received 30 Wright Liberator bodied Volvo B10Ls and 25 Wright Renown bodied Volvo B10BLEs. In 2004, the fleet was upgraded with 18 new Wright Eclipse Gemini double-deckers.

Xplore Dundee, then National Express Dundee, bought 29 new Wright Eclipse Urban 2-bodied Volvo B7RLE in 2011 and 2012 which were used to replace older vehicles.

In 2013, the company received its first nine Alexander Dennis Enviro 400 hybrid buses, partly funded by the Scottish Government Green Bus Fund. These were transferred to the Wolverhampton garage of National Express West Midlands which was already operating similar vehicles before the sale of the Dundee operations. 

In 2018, 14 brand new Alexander Dennis Enviro400 buses arrived to operate on route 22 And 12 new all new electric buses will operate on route 28 in 2021. These buses are branded Emerald and have USB ports and free Wi-Fi onboard. These were introduced on 2 December 2018, with 9 more in November 2019 and 12 more coming soon in 2021.

Subsidiary companies

Wishart Coaches
Wishart Coaches provides rural bus and coach services in the county of Angus, from its base in Friockheim. The operation previously traded as G&N Wishart and was the last remaining division of National Express in the Travel series of brands. On 25 May 2013 the Travel Wishart operating licence was sold to Gavin Kinnear who operates coach day-trips.

Xplore More
Xplore More (previously branded as NXDiscovrit) operates coach trips and excursions, as well as the X90 Dundee to Edinburgh Airport express service, which was launched on 9 June 2019.

Discover Dundee 
Xplore Dundee launched an open top tour bus in 2022 for Dundee which travels across the city from Discovery Point to the Dundee Law with an extension route across the Tay Road Bridge and connections to other bus routes via the city centre.

References

External links

Bus operators in Scotland
National Express companies
Tayside
Transport in Dundee